A Seattle roll is a makizushi roll similar to the California roll. It typically contains cucumber, avocado, raw Pacific salmon, and masago or tobiko. Variations include ingredients such as smoked or seared salmon, and almost always cream cheese. A favorite of local food critics, it can be found at numerous restaurants in Seattle. Like many Western-inspired sushi rolls, the ingredients and name are based on an American market.

References

Culture of Seattle
Pacific Northwest cuisine
Sushi in the United States
Avocado dishes